Daily Express Building is the name used to refer to a series of  art-deco buildings commissioned by Beaverbrook Associated Newspapers in the 1930s to house the three offices of the Daily Express newspaper:

 Daily Express Building, London (1932) - designed by Ellis and Clark. Lavishly decorated interior, now Grade II*
 Daily Express Building, Glasgow (1937) - designed by Ellis and Clark.
 Daily Express Building, Manchester (1939) - designed by Sir Owen Williams. Incorporates a futuristic facade, now Grade II*